Gehasst, verdammt, vergöttert … die letzten Jahre ( "Hated, doomed and adored ... the last years") is the first best-of album of the German rock band Böhse Onkelz.

Track listing

Böhse Onkelz albums
1994 compilation albums
German-language albums